Thru-hiking, or through-hiking, is the act of hiking an established long-distance trail end-to-end continuously. 

The term is most frequently used regarding trails in the United States, such as the Pacific Crest Trail (PCT), the Appalachian Trail (AT), and the Continental Divide Trail (CDT). Globally, some examples of thru-hikes include Te Araroa in New Zealand, the Camino de Santiago in Spain and France, the Via Francigena in France and Italy, the Grand Italian Trail in Italy, the Great Divide Trail (GDT) in Canada, and the Great Himalaya Trail in Nepal, all of which are over 1,000 km (620 mi) in length.

The length for a trail to be considered a thru-hike is undefined. Trails most associated with thru-hiking often take several weeks or months to complete, but any completed end-to-end trail is technically a thru-hike. Thruhiking also usually involves backpacking and camping, though not always.

Section hiking refers to hiking a long-distance trail one section at a time. Generally, a trail completed as a collection of section hikes is not considered a thru-hike, as the trail was not completed continuously. However, hiking trail sections out of order, e.g., starting at the halfway point of the AT and hiking to the northern terminus, then flying back to the middle and hiking the southern half, still counts as a thru-hike, as long as the trail is completed in one trip.

History
During the late 19th and early 20th centuries, hiking as a means of exploring the world started becoming popular in the US. This led to the creation of dedicated long-distance hiking trails, including the 439 km (273 mi) Long Trail in Vermont and the 340 km (211 mi) John Muir Trail in California.

The first trail to be associated with thru-hiking was the 3,531 km (2,194 mi) Appalachian Trail (AT), which was first proposed in 1921 by Benton MacKaye and completed in 1937 after more than a decade of work. The first person to hike the full trail was Myron Avery, a trail promoter who hiked the trail by sections between 1927 and 1936 while trail blazing. In 1948, Earl Shaffer completed the first south-to-north thru-hike of the AT, followed by Chester Dziengielewski in 1951, who became the first to hike the trail from north-to-south.

A number of thru-hikers have achieved a measure of celebrity status in backpacking culture. Perhaps the most famous was Emma "Grandma" Gatewood, who first thru-hiked the Appalachian Trail in 1955 at the age of 67. She completed the hike with what was considered extremely inadequate gear, even at the time, including sneakers rather than boots and a blanket rather than a sleeping bag, and is recognized today as a pioneer of ultralight backpacking.

In 2012, Cheryl Strayed published her memoir Wild documenting her self-discovery on the PCT, which was made into a film in 2014 starring Reese Witherspoon, leading to a spike in interest in the PCT and thruhiking.

Today
Thru-hiking a trail is a long and difficult journey. A thru-hike of the PCT, AT, or CDT takes five months on average, and can involve months or years of planning. Thru-hikers often organize "supply boxes" containing food and other necessities prior to their hike, and have friends or family mail the packages to predetermined stops close to the trail, to be picked up by the hiker. 

With the rise of backpacking in the United States, thru-hiking has become a minor niche in the industry. Thousands of hikers attempt to thru-hike the AT and other National Scenic Trails every year, although by some estimates fewer than 20% complete the trail. The most common reasons for a hike to be abandoned include injuries, finances, time constraints, and a lack of motivation. Some dedicated thru-hikers complete a trail more than once; about 30 have reported hiking the AT at least three times. Lee Barry became the oldest to thru-hike the AT when he completed a thru-hike (his second) in 2004 at age 81.

The Appalachian Trail Conservancy has reported completion rates around 25% in recent years, after several years under 20%. They attribute this to slightly lower numbers of hikers, better gear, and, thanks to the internet, information about gear, causing fewer hikers to start with  packs and drop out a few miles in. Those long-distance hikers who have completed all three of the nation's longest National Scenic Trails: The Appalachian Trail, The Pacific Crest Trail and The Continental Divide Trail are known as Triple Crowners.

See also

 Backpacking (hiking)
 Continental Divide Trail
 American Discovery Trail
 North Country Trail
 Hiking
 Hiking equipment
 List of long-distance footpaths
 Long-distance trail
 Pacific Crest Trail
 Tramping in New Zealand

Further reading
 Lugo, Derick (2019) “The Unlikely Thru-Hiker: An Appalachian Trail Journey”, Publisher: Appalachian Mountain Club Books, 
 Bruce, Dan (2000) The Thru-Hiker's Handbook Hot Springs, North Carolina: Center for Appalachian Trail Studies.
 Norton, Russell (1997) Long Trail End-to-Ender's Guide. Waterbury Center, Vermont: Green Mountain Club.
 Shaffer, Earl V. (1983) Walking With Spring. Harper's Ferry, West Virginia: the Appalachian Trail Conference.
 Berger, Karen and Daniel Smith (1993). Where the Waters Divide: A Walk along America's Continental Divide. New York: Random House.
Bryson, Bill (1998). A Walk in the Woods. Broadway Books.

References

External links
 Appalachian Trail Conservancy – 2000 Milers
 Appalachian Long Distance Hikers Association
 End to End on the Long Trail
 Pacific Crest Trail Association
 Trekopedia – Community site of long-distance trails
 American Discovery Trail Society
 HikaNation

Hiking